Kalmiyabash (Qalmıyabaş) is a rural locality (a village) in Kalmiyabashevsky Selsoviet, Kaltasinsky District, Bashkortostan, Russia. The population was 351 as of 2010. There are 6 streets.

Geography 
Kalmiyabash is located 18 km southeast of Kaltasy (the district's administrative centre) by road. Babayevo is the nearest rural locality.

References 

Rural localities in Kaltasinsky District